Mesud may refer to:

 Mesud I, sultan of the Seljuqs of Rum from 1116 until his death in 1156
 Mesud II, bore the title of Seljuq Sultan of Rum at various times between 1284 and 1308

See also
 Masoud